The Fifth Mother of all Battles Championship, commonly referred to as the 1995 Iraqi Elite Cup, was the fifth occurrence of the Iraqi Elite Cup, organised by the Iraq Football Association. The top eight teams of the 1994–95 Iraqi National League competed in the tournament. Despite being the 1995 edition, the tournament was held in 1996. In the final, held at Al-Shaab Stadium, Al-Talaba defeated Al-Quwa Al-Jawiya 1–0.

Group stage

Group 1

Group 2

Semifinals

Third place match

Final

References

External links
 Iraqi Football Website

Football competitions in Iraq
1995–96 in Iraqi football